The Bedford MW was a general service truck used by the British Armed Forces during the Second World War.

Design
The Bedford MW was a 15 cwt (760 kg) 4x2 truck, powered by a Bedford  six-cylinder inline  petrol engine through a four speed transmission.

Despite lacking four wheel drive and so being unsuited for off-road use, the MW's powerful engine, short wheel base, low centre of gravity and relatively light weight gave it excellent acceleration and almost sports car like handling.

The early MWs were open cabbed with a folding windscreen and a collapsible canvas tilt, from 1943 an enclosed cab with doors and perspex side screens was added, retaining the canvas top. The vehicle had a distinctive wide bonnet, necessitated by the need to accommodate a special extra large air filter that was never fitted to production vehicles.

History
In 1935 the War Office issued specifications for a new 15 cwt 4x2 military truck for service with the British Army, inviting manufacturers to submit designs to take part in annual comparative trials in north Wales, one entrant was a modification of a Bedford Vehicles 2-ton rear wheel drive lorry. Following these trials Bedford fitted a larger radiator and larger tyres, the trials were repeated in 1936 after which Bedford modified the chassis to increase ground clearance and installed a new engine cooling system. For the 1937 trials a new special Bedford WD-1 prototype was produced with a 15 cwt payload, it performed admirably and in 1938 the eventual  engine was installed.

Between 1939 and 1945 Bedford produced over 66,000 MWs, the vehicles remained in British service until the late 1950s.

Use
The MW was intended mainly to be a workhorse for the British Army's infantry battalions, but throughout the war it was adapted to a number of roles and was eventually also used by the Royal Air Force, Royal Navy, other government departments and some overseas customers.

Variants
The Bedford MW was built in multiple variants including:
 Bedford MWD cargo truck with General Service body approx . Main transport of an infantry battalion.
 Bedford MWC water tank truck
 Bedford MWT anti-aircraft gun tractor
Bedford MWG QF 2-pounder or 20mm Oerlikon portee
Bedford MWR radio truck
 Bedford MWV Royal Air Force signals van

Gallery

References

External links

 Bedford MWC  at Danish army vehicles

Military trucks of the United Kingdom
World War II vehicles of the United Kingdom
Soft-skinned vehicles
MW
Military vehicles introduced in the 1930s